7th Corps, Seventh Corps, or VII Corps may refer to:

 VII Corps (Grande Armée), a corps of the Imperial French army during the Napoleonic Wars
 VII Corps (German Empire), a unit of the Imperial German Army prior to and during World War I
 VII Reserve Corps (German Empire), a unit of the Imperial German Army during World War I
 VII Corps (Ottoman Empire)
 7th Rifle Corps, Soviet Union
 7th Corps (Turkey)
 VII Corps (United Kingdom) 
 VII Corps (United States), a unit of the United States Army
 VII Corps (Union Army), two separate formations of the Union Army (North) during the American Civil War
 Seventh Army Corps (Spanish–American War), a unit of the United States Army
 VII Corps, part of Ground Operations Command, South Korea

See also
List of military corps by number
 7th Army (disambiguation)
 7th Brigade (disambiguation)
 7th Division (disambiguation)
 7th Group (disambiguation)
 7th Regiment (disambiguation)
 7 Squadron (disambiguation)